Jason Rae (born November 25, 1986) is an American activist and Democratic National Committee (DNC) member from Wisconsin. He is the youngest person ever elected to the DNC. On February 5, 2017, he was elected to serve as secretary of the DNC.

Early life and education
Rae was born in Rice Lake, Wisconsin, to John and Lori Rae. He was a student at Marquette University, from which he graduated with a BA in history and political science. He is an associate at Nation Consulting in Milwaukee.

College activism
Rae was the chair of the Marquette University chapter of College Democrats and was elected Chair of the College Democrats of Wisconsin in 2008. Within Marquette University Student Government (MUSG), he was Legislative Vice President, in which he formed of the Ad Hoc Committee on Funding of Student Activities. He previously served in the MUSG Senate as Senator, student representative to the Faculty Academic Senate, College of Arts & Sciences Committee chair, and Parliamentarian. Rae was the author of a bill passed by the Marquette University Student Government to provide domestic partner benefits to faculty.

At Marquette, Rae received the 2008 Outstanding Class Member Award for the junior class. Rae is on the Board of Directors for the Rice Lake Boys Club.

Political involvement
In 2004, Rae was vice chair of the Barron County Democratic Party and was appointed to Senator Russ Feingold's re-election steering committee.

Rae was elected to the Democratic National Committee (DNC) in June 2004. At the time of his election to his leadership role within the party, he was 17, making him the youngest person ever elected to the DNC. The party election garnered much press coverage, as a state legislator and the president of the state's firefighters' union were among the losing candidates for the position.

Rae's election to the DNC was unexpected.

Rae attended the 2004 Democratic National Convention as a guest of the Wisconsin delegation. He was a superdelegate for the 2008 convention in Denver. Rae is chair of the DNC's Youth Council. In this position, he has worked on increasing youth involvement in politics and seeing that candidates address issues of importance to young people. He has spoken at DNC meetings to members of Kids for Democracy and Y-Press.

In spring 2007, Governor Jim Doyle (D-WI) appointed Rae as the youth representative to the Governor's Commission on the United Nations. From June 23–30, 2007, Rae participated in a delegation of 10 DNC members to Taiwan, where they met with various elected officials in the Taiwanese government to better understand the present situation with China.

Rae worked on the Allen Thomell campaign for the Georgia State House and the Herb Kohl for United States Senate campaign. He has also interned at People for the American Way. In the summer of 2006 he interned at the Gay and Lesbian Victory Fund. He came out as gay to members of the DNC in February 2007, which he discussed in an interview in The Advocate in February 2008.

On February 21, 2008 Rae announced his support of Senator Barack Obama for the Democratic nomination for President of the United States.

Rae's ultimate goal in politics is to become President himself.

Rae currently serves as the Board President of Fair Wisconsin, a statewide LGBT advocacy organization.

Rae attended the 2016 Democratic National Convention in Philadelphia as a superdelegate, where he pledged support to Hillary Clinton.

Media appearances
Rae has appeared on television news shows including MSNBC's Live with Dan Abrams and CNN's Anderson Cooper 360°, on radio, and in news reports about his experiences. He recounted meeting with Michelle Obama, having breakfast with Chelsea Clinton, and receiving calls from Bill Clinton, John Kerry, Madeleine Albright, and others. BBC TV's North America editor briefly interviewed Rae in a report on the 2008 Democratic Party primaries on  10 O'clock News on April 21, 2008. Jason Jones interviewed Rae on The Daily Show.

Rae is included on a list of openly gay politicians in The Advocate's "Forty under 40" issue of June/July 2009.

References

External links 
Introducing DNC Member Jason Rae
Democratic Party of Wisconsin
Jason Rae in interview with Justin Webb of the BBC

1986 births
Living people
21st-century American politicians
Gay politicians
LGBT people from Wisconsin
American LGBT politicians
Marquette University alumni
People from Rice Lake, Wisconsin
Wisconsin Democrats